Signs of the Time (Live) is the live album/DVD by Mob Rules, released in 2005.

Recorded June 18, 2004 at Pumpwerk Wilhelmshaven, Germany • Engineered by Markus Teske & Sascha Onnen • Mixed and mastered by Markus Teske, Bazement Studio • Filmed by ROAX-Films Directed by Ronald Mattes & Alexander Max Braune • Live Sound: Uli Thiessen • Lights: Bastian Strauss • Monitoring: Andreas Schulz
Animation: Timo Blazycsek • DVD-Authoring: Frank • KnöllnerPhotos: Susanne Pramschiefer • Artwork: Thomas Ewerhard

Track listing
"Black Rain" – 06:08
"Lord of Madness" – 05:34
"Celebration Day (Sun Serenade Opus 1)" – 06:32
"Hydrophobia" – 03:41
"Outer Space" – 03:39
"Unknown Man" – 05:50
"Among the Gods" – 07:50
"The End of All Days" – 08:49
"Hollowed Be Thy Name" – 05:35
"Speed of Life" – 03:42
"(In the Land of) Wind and Rain" – 06:37
"The Temple Fanfare" – 02:05
"Pilot of Earth" – 04:11
"Rain Song" – 05:39

Mob Rules (band) albums
2005 live albums